Counting Cars is an American reality television series shown on History and produced by Leftfield Pictures. The series, which is the third spinoff of Pawn Stars, is filmed in Las Vegas, where it chronicles the daily activities at Count's Kustoms, an automobile restoration and customization company owned and operated by Danny Koker a.k.a. The Count, who previously appeared as a recurring expert on Pawn Stars. In a format similar to another Pawn Stars spinoff, American Restoration, the series follows Koker and his staff as they restore and modify classic automobiles and motorcycles. Counting Cars debuted on August 13, 2012.

Production history 
Counting Cars is an American reality-television series, shown on History, and produced by Leftfield Pictures. The series is the third spinoff of the TV series Pawn Stars, following American Restoration and Cajun Pawn Stars. It is filmed in Las Vegas, where it chronicles the daily activities at Count's Kustoms, an automobile restoration and customization company owned and operated by legendary Danny Koker, who previously appeared as a recurring expert on Pawn Stars. In a format similar to American Restoration, the series follows Koker and his staff as they restore and modify classic automobiles and motorcycles, and documents the occasional conflict among the cast members.

The series debuted August 13, 2012, after Pawn Stars before assuming its regular Tuesday time slot the following day.

The show's initial executive producers were History's Zachary Behr and Julian Hobbs, and Leftfield Pictures' Brent Montgomery, David George, and Shawn Witt. The series was created by co-executive producer Joel Patterson. By mid-2014, Behr and Ed de Rivaz were History's executive producers on the show, with Tom Romita and Jonathan Wyche joining the three Leftfield executive producers as co-executive producers. In early 2015, Simon Thomas had joined as a fourth Leftfield executive producer, and Sean Moran had succeeded Romita as a co-executive producer.

Episodes

Cast 
Danny "The Count" Koker is the owner of Count's Kustoms, a shop devoted to the repair and restoration of motor vehicles, automobiles, and motorcycles in particular. The shop's name is derived from Koker's stint as part-owner of local independent station KFBT (now KVCW), during which he hosted a weekly B-movie showcase, Saturday Fright at the Movies, as "Count Cool Rider". Koker, who grew up in Cleveland and Detroit, is a self-taught mechanic who comes from a family of Ford Motor Company employees. He also heads a Las Vegas hard rock band, Count's 77.
Scott Jones was the manager of Count's Kustoms, and Danny's bookkeeper. Scott left between the second and third seasons and is only mentioned briefly in the third-season premiere (having moved to Tennessee after the birth of his son).
Kevin Mack is Danny's right-hand man and best friend for the past 20 years by the series premiere.
Michael "Horny Mike" Henry is an airbrush artist
Roli Szabo is the shop's detailer, responsible for cleaning and polishing of all the vehicles on which Count's Kustoms works.
Shannon Aikau is the bike shop manager and lead builder whom Danny lauds for his fabrication and engineering skills, referring to him as the "A-Number One" in the bike shop.
Ryan Evans is the head painter and graphic artist. Began working with Shannon in the bike shop. Is now Danny's "main man" when it comes to custom paint.
Big Ryan is Danny's project scout, parts expert, and picker, with over 15 years of experience.
Harry "Grandpa" Rome Sr. is an employee who does body work at the shop.
Joseph "Doc" Duggan integrates technology in working with the cars or adding advanced technological features with the classics.
George is one of the mechanics who has worked at the shop for years.

References

External links 
 

2010s American reality television series
2012 American television series debuts
2021 American television series endings
American television spin-offs
Automotive television series
English-language television shows
History (American TV channel) original programming
Pawn Stars
Reality television spin-offs
Television shows set in Las Vegas
Conservation and restoration of vehicles